Sudis hyalina is a species of fish in the family Paralepididae (barracudinas).

Name
Its specific name hyalina is from the Ancient Greek ὑάλῐνος (hyalinos, "crystal, glass").

It has no common name in English, but is known in Turkish as yalanci zargana ("false garfish") or derin deniz turna baligi ("deep-sea pike") and in Hebrew as ליסטים ארוך-סנפיר (listim aroch-snapir, "long-fin bandit"); this name refers to its long pectoral fins.

Description

It has large teeth in the lower jaw, fixed and armed with serrated edges. It has 59 or 60 vertebrae.

Habitat

Sudis hyalina lives in the Atlantic Ocean and Mediterranean Sea.

Behavipour
Sudis hyalina spawns near the surface in temperate to tropical waters.

It is believed to be one of the fish responsible for chewing at submarine communications cable.

References

Paralepididae
Fish described in 1810
Taxa named by Constantine Samuel Rafinesque